The women's football tournament at the 2019 Pan American Games will be held in Lima from 28 July to 9 August 2019. The eight teams involved in the tournament were required to register a squad of 18 players, including two goalkeepers.

For the football competition in these Games, the women competed in an eight-team tournament. The teams were grouped into two pools of four teams each for a round-robin preliminary round. The top two teams in each group advanced to a single elimination bracket. The women’s competition was an open-age competition with no age restrictions.

Group A

Mexico

Head Coach: Christopher Cuellar

The following players were called-up for the 2019 Pan American Games. Andrea Sánchez was replaced by Kimberly Rodríguez.

Jamaica

Head coach: Hue Menzies

The following 18 players were named to the roster for the 2019 Pan American Games. Konya Plummer was injured and replaced by Trudi Carter. Carter was then replaced by Lauren Silver due to injury.

Paraguay

Head coach: Daniel Almada

The following players were called up for the 2019 Pan American Games.

Colombia

Head coach: Nelson Abadia

The following players were called up for the 2019 Pan American Games. Sandra Sepúlveda and Yisela Cuesta were ruled out due to injury and were replaced by Stefany Castaño and Michell Lugo.

Group B

Panama

Head coach: Victor Daniel Suarez

The following players were called-up for the 2019 Pan American Games.

Costa Rica

The following players were called up for the 2019 Pan American Games.

Head coach: Amelia Valverde

Argentina

Head coach: Carlos Borrello

The following players were called up for the 2019 Pan American Games.

Peru

Head coach: Doriva Bueno

The 18-women squad was announced on 25 June 2019.

References

Football at the 2019 Pan American Games
Pan American Games women's football squads